Beğendik is a village in the Tercan District, Erzincan Province, Turkey. The village is populated by Kurds of the Şikakî tribe and had a population of 100 in 2021.

The hamlets of Atlıca, Hüseyinefendi and Tuzla are attached to the village.

References 

Villages in Tercan District
Kurdish settlements in Erzincan Province